NSPM may refer to:
 Nova srpska politička misao, a Belgrade-based publisher and quarterly magazine founded in 1994
 National Security Presidential Memorandum, the name for national security directives under the Donald Trump presidency